The South Shields trolleybus system once served the town of South Shields, then in County Durham, but now in Tyne and Wear, England.

By the standards of the various now defunct trolleybus systems in the United Kingdom, the South Shields system was a medium-sized one, with a total of 11 routes, and a maximum fleet of 61 trolleybuses.

One of the former South Shields trolleybuses is now preserved, at the Trolleybus Museum at Sandtoft, Lincolnshire.

See also

History of South Shields
Public transport in South Shields
Transport in Tyne and Wear
List of trolleybus systems in the United Kingdom

References

Notes

Further reading

External links

SCT'61 website - photos and descriptions of a South Shields trolleybus and early motorbuses
National Trolleybus Archive
British Trolleybus Society, based in Reading
National Trolleybus Association, based in London

Transport in Tyne and Wear
South Shields
South Shields

Transport in South Shields